The Magnanime was a 74-gun of the French Navy, lead ship of her class.

Career 

She took part in the American War of Independence in De Grasse's squadron, under Captain Le Bègue de Germiny, most notably in the Battle of the Chesapeake, in the Battle of St. Lucia, and in the Battle of the Saintes.

In 1782 or 1783, she was under Sainte-Eulalie.

Fate 
Magnanime was broken up in Brest in 1793.

Sources and references 
 Notes

Citations

Bibliography
 

Ships of the line of the French Navy
Magnanime-class ships of the line
Shipwrecks in the Atlantic Ocean
1779 ships